al-ʻAfūw (ALA-LC romanization of ) is one of the Names of Allah. It means The Pardoner, The Most Forgiving, The Effacing, The Eliminator of Sins. It is part of the 99 Names of God, by which  Muslims regard God, and it is described in Qur'an and Sunnah.

Descriptive meaning of the name 

 The One who blots out and leaves no trace of any sin or fault.
 The One who passes over and absolves any fault.
 The One who can remove and obliterate all traces of wrong actions.
 The One who can make any sin, error or fault disappear.

Linguistic translation of Afuw

Afuw is said to come from the root 'a-f-a which has the following classical Arabic connotations:

 to forgive, pardon
 to pass over, forgo, absolve
 to obliterate all traces, efface, remove
 to kill-off, allow to die
 to turn away from punishing, not see, annul
 to make unapparent, imperceptible
 to give spontaneously, to give without constraint
 to give more than what is due

Deeper explanation

Traditionally, it is translated as "Forgiver" and "Pardoner". However, according to the book "Al-Maqsad Al-Asna fi Sharah Asma' Allahu al-Husna" (aka The best means in explaining Allah's Beautiful Names), Imam Al Ghazali defines this Attribute as The One Who Erases Sin. To have a better understanding how Al-Afuw differs from other Attributes such as Al-Ghaffar and Al-Ghaffur, the following is an excerpt from the translation of Imam Al Ghazali's work by Robert Charles Stade:

"Al-Afu is the One Who erases sins and disregards acts of disobedience. This concept approximates the sense of Al-Ghafur, (the One Who forgives much), though the former is more far-reaching than the latter. For Al-Ghufran indicates a veiling (of the sin) whereas Al-Afu indicates an erasing, and the erasing (of sin) is more far-reaching (than the simple veiling of it)."

Another way to better understand this Attribute is to consider the metaphor which the classical Arabic dictionary, Taj al-Arûs, offers wherein 'afûw is said to be like the desert wind completely obliterating footprints in the sand.  The same type of metaphor is used in the book, "Physicians of the Heart: A Sufi View of the 99 Names of Allah".  The author states:

"Let’s begin with a physical metaphor that is part of the word’s root meaning: Afu til … (Arabic?). This is an image of the wind blowing across the desert vastness and completely erasing all the tracks in the sand. It is as if no one had ever walked there. Such a fundamental image in the root of the word shows us that with al-‘Afuw, you do not even notice the fault."

Occurrence in Quran

The Name of Allah, Al-’Afuw, can be found in the Quran five times. It is linked several times with Al-Ghafoor (4:43, 4:99, 22:60, 58:2) and once with Al-Qadeer (4:149).

Occurrence in Hadith

In At-Tirmidhi by Imam Tirmidhi in Book 9, Hadith 1195, it is mentioned:

Hazrat Aisha (R.A) asked Prophet Muhammad: "O Messenger of Allah! If I realize Lailat-ul-Qadr (Night of Decree), what should I supplicate in it?" He (ﷺ) replied, "You should supplicate:

Allahumma innaka 'afuwwun, tuhibbul-'afwa, fa'fu 'anni

الْلَّهُمَّ اِنَّكَ عَفُوٌّ تُحِبُّ الْعَفْوَ فَاعْفُ عَنَّي

'O Allah, You are The Forgiver, You Love Forgiveness, so Forgive me'.

References

Afuw